Manek Chowk is a notable city square in Old Ahmedabad, India. It is surrounded by historical structures. It is a vegetable market in the morning, a bullion market in the noon and the street food market at night.

Etymology

It is named after saint Maneknath who interrupted and helped Ahmed Shah I build Bhadra Fort in 1411.

Manek Chowk
This bustling open square near the center of the city functions as a vegetable market in the morning and a jewellery market in the afternoon, the second biggest in India, at an apparently 3 million rupees of annual turnover. It is most famous, however, for its food stalls that start to emerge around 9:30 in the evening and continue till late night, with various local street snacks.
Manek chowk is best known for its Kulfi.

Food Street
Manek Chowk is one of the few of the food-street which is allowed to stay open till late night. Bhajipau, dosa, typical local sandwiches, and many more local cuisines are available.

Structures

Some heritage structures are in vicinity.

Baba Maneknath Temple
The memorial temple where the saint Maneknath took samadhi, is situated in Manek Chowk.

Badshah no Hajiro

This is where the male members of the royal family were buried. Ahmed Shah I, founder of Ahmedabad was buried here. Women are not allowed to enter, and men must wear something to cover their heads before entering. There are also a few minister’s tombs laid out across the road. It lies to the west of Manek Chowk.

Rani no Hajiro

On the street leading to the Rani no Hajiro (Queen’s tomb), where the female members of the royal family were buried, is now a market for women's clothing, jewellery and accessories. Traditional Garba clothes are also sold here. Many types of mouth fresheners, Mukhwas, stalls are nearby. Rani no Hajiro lies to the east of Manek Chowk.

Ahmedabad Stock Exchange Building

Ahmedabad Stock Exchange was established in 1894. It is the oldest stock exchange after Bombay Stock Exchange in India. ASE functioned here till 1996 and it is 93 years old heritage building and an example of British architecture.

Mahurat Pol
It was the first pol (housing cluster) of Ahmedabad. Jains settled here around the 1450s. There are two temples inside pol, Sheetalnath Jain temple and Dholeshwar Mahadev temple.

See also
 Ahmedabad
 Bhadra Fort
 Fort and Gates of Ahmedabad

References

Further reading
 Gujarat Tourism

Tourist attractions in Ahmedabad
Squares in India